The 1936–37 international cricket season was from September 1936 to April 1937.

Season overview

December

England in Australia

March

England in Ceylon

MCC in New Zealand

References

International cricket competitions by season
1936 in cricket
1937 in cricket